Adam Skumawitz (born 1979) is an American businessman, soccer coach, and former professional player who played for Aalesunds FK in the Eliteserien in 2003.

Career
Skumawitz currently lives in southern California and is the Vice President of Anselmo Investment Management  . He is the founder of Football Proper soccer training academy and was elected to serve on the Temecula Valley Unified School District Governing Board in 2018.

College

Skumawitz was born in Newport Beach, CA, and played college soccer at Cornell University from 1997 to 2001 and decided he would play internationally in Germany and Norway. He is the all-time leader in Cornell Men's Soccer history for games played (67) and games started (64) and was the team's leading scorer in 2000.

Professional
Skumawitz turned professional in 2001 and spent one season with the Boston Bulldogs before joining FC Gruen-Weiss Wolfen and finishing his playing career in the Norwegian Premier League with Aalesunds FK.

Norway

Coming from the German professional team Gruen-Weiss Wolfen to Aalesunds of the Norwegian Premier League in summer 2003, Skumawitz was viewed as the club's savior from relegation by their fans, able to be used in midfield or attack. However, even though he scored the second goal to beat Lyn 2-0 on his debut, The American's professional career was truncated by a back injury.

International
Although Skumawitz never earned a cap for the United States national team, he participated in the Olympic Development Program throughout his youth soccer playing on the California State and Region IV select teams.

Coaching
Skumawitz began coaching immediately after he finished playing overseas and coached for 15 years before retiring from the field in 2015. His first position was as the Varsity Head Coach for the Temecula Valley Girls High School team, winning a CIF (California) State championship and completing an undefeated season in his second year in charge. In club soccer, Skumawitz served as the College Liaison and Girls Head Coach for Carlsbad Elite (now named LA Galaxy San Diego) and led his team to a US Youth National Championship and number one national youth ranking.

References

External links 
 Altomfotball.no Profile 
 
 SoccerStats.us Profile

1979 births
Expatriate footballers in Norway
American people of Polish descent
Association football forwards
American expatriate soccer players
American soccer coaches
Aalesunds FK players
American expatriate soccer players in Germany
Living people
American soccer players
Cornell University alumni
American expatriate soccer coaches